is a railway station in the city of Gotemba, Shizuoka Prefecture, Japan, operated by the East Japan Railway Company (JR Tōkai ).

Lines

Station layout
Minami-Gotemba Station has one side platform serving a single bi-directional track. The station is unattended.

History 
Minami-Gotemba Station opened on July 20, 1962. Operational control of the station was transferred to JR Central following privatization of Japanese National Railways (JNR) on April 1, 1987.

Station numbering was introduced to the Gotemba Line in March 2018; Minami-Gotemba Station was assigned station number CB11.

Passenger statistics
In fiscal 2017, the station was used by an average of 311 passengers daily (boarding passengers only).

Surrounding area
L'Oréal Japan factory

See also
 List of Railway Stations in Japan

References

External links

 website 

Railway stations in Japan opened in 1962
Railway stations in Shizuoka Prefecture
Gotemba Line
Stations of Central Japan Railway Company
Gotemba, Shizuoka